The Hudson Valley Philharmonic (abbreviated HVP) is a symphony orchestra based in Poughkeepsie, New York in the United States. It began in 1932, and it serves the Hudson Valley region.

The Philharmonic offers a series of concert performances in the Bardavon 1869 Opera House (Poughkeepsie) or the Ulster Performing Arts Center (Kingston).
 
The orchestra makes regular guest appearances at festival venues, including SUNY New Paltz’s Piano Summer, the Bowdoin Park pavilion of Dutchess County, and the Bethel Woods Center for the Arts.

History

In 1932, four Poughkeepsie businessmen who were also dedicated string players—George Hagstrom, Sydney Fleishman, Charles T. Miller and Dr. Charles Hoffman—formed the nucleus of local musicians that eventually evolved into the Dutchess County Philharmonic Orchestra (DCPO). With Hagstrom as its first conductor, the orchestra was made up of amateurs and professionals alike, plus a number of music students from surrounding high schools. In 1934, local backing enabled the DCPO to perform its first series of public concerts. By the 1940s, it had grown to 93 musicians. DCPO repertoire was largely classical, including some contemporary music and works by local composers.

In 1945, George Hagstrom stepped down as music director, handing the baton over to Ole Windingstad, formerly a conductor for the Oslo Philharmonic, Norway.  Windingstad also served as conductor to the New Orleans Philharmonic from 1940 to 1944. On October 29, 1953, under his direction, the orchestra presented a program of two Norwegian composers, Grieg and Sparre-Olsen, at New York's Carnegie Hall. It was also during Windingstad's tenure that the orchestra presented Prokofiev's Peter and the Wolf, narrated by former first lady Eleanor Roosevelt.

By 1959, Claude Monteux, world-class flutist and son of conductor Pierre Monteux, had elevated the orchestra to a fully professional ensemble, renamed the Hudson Valley Philharmonic Society, Inc. Under his baton, the HVP became a prestigious regional orchestra. The Young People's Concerts program offered today is a direct descendant of the school-day concerts introduced by Claude Monteux.

Imre Palló, formerly director of the German Opera on the Rhine and New York City Opera conductor, succeeded Claude Monteux as Music Director in 1976. Pallo introduced the first Hudson Valley Philharmonic opera series in 1978, and in 1979 established a pops series modeled after the successful Boston Pops.

Randall Craig Fleischer became the third music director of the HVP during the orchestra's 1992 season and held the position till his death in 2020. Under Fleischer's leadership, the orchestra evolved into one of the region's major performing arts and educational assets. As has been widely reported, the Hudson Valley Philharmonic Society, Inc. sustained a financial crisis in 1998.

To save the forty-year-old cultural cornerstone of the community, local regional philanthropic foundations stated their willingness to commit substantial support provided the Bardavon would step in to reorganize and reinstate the orchestra.  A Juilliard teaching artist and affiliate of the New York Philharmonic redesigned the Young Peoples' concert program.  The New York State Legislature and the foundations aided the Bardavon to purchase the assets and name Hudson Valley Philharmonic.  On June 3, 1999, the Hudson Valley Philharmonic officially became a Bardavon subsidiary.  Each year, the program provides thousands of regional school children with the opportunity to view orchestral concerts.

Principal players

The current principal chairs of the orchestra are as follows:

References

External links
Bardavon 1869 Opera House website, accessed 16 May 2013

1932 establishments in New York (state)
Dutchess County, New York
Ulster County, New York
Orchestras based in New York (state)
Musical groups established in 1932